Rosemeadow is a suburb of Sydney, in the state of New South Wales, Australia. Rosemeadow is located 56 kilometres south-west of the Sydney central business district, in the local government area of the City of Campbelltown and is part of the Macarthur region.

History
Rosemeadow owes its name to early settler Thomas Rose, who in 1818 bought a farm called Mount Gilead which covered parts of modern-day Rosemeadow and neighbouring Gilead. Rose was a baker and publican as well as a farmer, building a mill on his property and a couple of large dams which helped him and his neighbours survive the drought of 1829.

The area remained farmland until the mid-1970s when Sydney's urban sprawl reached it and the suburb was officially named in 1976. The Rosemeadow public housing estate is an example of the American Radburn design for public housing which turns houses around so they back on to streets with the fronts facing each other. This design has been criticised in Sydney as contributing to social problems and following an incident of street violence in 2009 orders were made to partially demolish the estate.
Since the partial demolishing of the suburb, the streets have begun to be renamed.

Commercial area
Rosemeadow Marketplace, on the corner of Copperfield Drive and Fitzgibbon Lane, is a medium-sized shopping centre. The local post office sits within the Marketplace and nearby is a community health centre, fire station, high school and an Anglican church.

Schools
John Therry Catholic High School is the oldest school near the suburb, having opened in 1981. Next door is its feeder school, Our Lady Help of Christians Parish School. Public schools include Rosemeadow Public, Ambarvale High and Mary Brooksbank Special School. The oldest school built in the suburb is Rosemeadow Public School, located on Anthony and Copperfield Drive.

Parks & Reserves
There are a number of parks and reserves within or boarding Rosemeadow. These are:

 Canidius Reserve
 Octavia Reserve
 Demetrius Reserve
 Greco Reserve
 Flagstaff Reserve
 Oswald Reserve
 Heydon Park
 Rizal Park
 Rosemeadow Reserve

Transport
Rosemeadow can be accessed via Appin Road or via surrounding suburbs of Ambarvale and Glen Alpine. The main road passing through Rosemeadow would be Copperfield drive. The suburb is serviced by Busabout buses, which provide links to Macarthur and Campbelltown railway stations as well as occasional services to Appin and Wollongong via the 888 and 887 buses.

Notable residents
 Current Matildas and Sydney FC footballer Alanna Kennedy.

People
According to the 2006 census, Rosemeadow had a population of 7,415 people. There were higher than average numbers of families with children (77%) and common occupations included technicians and tradespeople (18%), clerical and administrative (16%), labourers (13%) and machinery operators and drivers (13%). Three-quarters of the suburb is detached housing with the remaining semi-detached or townhouses. More than half the homes are being purchased while around a fifth are rented from the Department of Housing.

References

Suburbs of Sydney
Towns in the Macarthur (New South Wales)
City of Campbelltown (New South Wales)